The 1977–78 OB I bajnokság season was the 41st season of the OB I bajnokság, the top level of ice hockey in Hungary. Four teams participated in the league, and Ferencvarosi TC won the championship.

Regular season

Playoffs

3rd place 
 Alba Volán Székesfehérvár - Budapesti Vasutas SC 1:2 (3:4, 8:5, 3:5)

Final 
 Ferencvárosi TC - Újpesti Dózsa SC 2:1 (6:3, 3:4, 6:3)

External links
 Season on hockeyarchives.info

Hun
OB I bajnoksag seasons
1977–78 in Hungarian ice hockey